"Til I Can Make It on My Own" is a song co-written and first recorded by American country music artist Tammy Wynette.  It was released in January 1976 as the first single and title track from the album 'Til I Can Make It On My Own.  The song was Wynette's fifteenth number one on the country charts.  The single stayed at number one for one week and spent a total of eleven weeks on the country charts. Wynette noted on multiple occasions that the song was her personal favorite of all that she had written or recorded, and it would remain a staple of her concerts for the remainder of her career.  Wynette wrote the song with George Richey and Billy Sherrill.

Cover versions
Kenny Rogers and Dottie West released their own version in July 1979 and took it up to #3 on the country charts. It was also covered by Billy Gilman on his 2000 album One Voice and by Martina McBride in 2005 on her Timeless album. Lulu Roman (of Hee Haw fame) released a cover on her 2013 album At Last featuring Georgette Jones (daughter of Tammy Wynette and George Jones) on harmony vocals. Georgette then released an album with this as the title track in 2013.

Charts

Tammy Wynette

Year-end charts

Kenny Rogers and Dottie West

Year-end charts

References

1976 singles
1979 singles
Tammy Wynette songs
Kenny Rogers songs
Dottie West songs
Billy Gilman songs
Martina McBride songs
Male–female vocal duets
Songs written by Billy Sherrill
Songs written by George Richey
Song recordings produced by Billy Sherrill
Song recordings produced by Larry Butler (producer)
Epic Records singles
United Artists Records singles
Songs written by Tammy Wynette
1976 songs